Burkhard Stangl (born 6 November 1960 in Eggenburg, Lower Austria) is a composer and musician, currently residing in Vienna, Austria. Playing primarily guitar and electronics, he is a prolific performer in the world of electro-acoustic improvisation, having participated in over 50 recordings. One of his most noted recordings is schnee, a duet with Cristof Kurzmann, inspired by four films and a quote from writer Robert Walser. It has been recorded live, as schnee_live, and has spawned a similarly themed "meta-song suite," neuschnee. His 1997 opera Der Venusmond was recorded partially on the observation deck of the Empire State Building.

Partial discography
Recital (Durian, 1999)
Schnee - with Cristof Kurmann, (Erstwhile, 2000)
Venusmond - with Oswald Eggers, (Quell, 2000)
An Old Fashioned Duet - with Taku Sugimoto, (Slub, 2002)
Eh - with Dieb13, (Erstwhile, 2002)
Neuschnee - with Cristof Kurzmann (Erstpop, 2009)
Musik - Ein Porträt in Sehnsucht - with Kai Fagaschinski, (Erstwhile, 2009)
Scuba - with Angélica Castelló, Billy Roisz and Dieb13, (Mikroton, 2014)
Sqid - with Angélica Castelló, Mario De Vega and Attila Faravelli (Mikroton, 2015)
Jardin Des Bruits - with Dieb13, (Mikroton, 2019)
With Steve Lacy
Itinerary (hat ART, 1991)
With Franz Koglmann 
L'Heure Bleue (HatART, 1991)
We Thought About Duke (HatART, 1994) with Lee Konitz

External links
 Personal Website
 Artist's Myspace Page
 schnee Website

References

1960 births
Living people
People from Eggenburg
Free improvisation
Avant-garde guitarists
Austrian guitarists